Alcohol dehydrogenase (cytochrome c) (type I quinoprotein alcohol dehydrogenase, quinoprotein ethanol dehydrogenase) is an enzyme with systematic name alcohol:cytochrome c oxidoreductase. This enzyme catalyses the following chemical reaction

 a primary alcohol + 2 ferricytochrome c  an aldehyde + 2 ferrocytochrome c + 2 H+

A periplasmic PQQ-containing quinoprotein is present in Pseudomonas and Rhodopseudomonas.

References

External links 
 

EC 1.1.2